The Fog is a 1923 American silent drama film directed by Paul Powell and starring Mildred Harris. It was adapted from the novel of the same name by William Dudley Pelley.

A poster for this film was later featured in the Buster Keaton film Sherlock Jr. (1924).

Cast

Production
The Fog was produced at the Graf studio in San Mateo with exteriors filmed in the San Francisco area. Casting was conducted in early 1923; Cullen Landis was the first to be cast.

Preservation
With no prints of The Fog located in any film archives, it is a lost film.

References

External links

1923 films
American silent feature films
American black-and-white films
Films based on works by William Dudley Pelley
Films directed by Paul Powell (director)
1923 drama films
Silent American drama films
Metro Pictures films
1920s American films